CFM is an Independent Local Radio station based in Carlisle, England, owned and operated by Bauer as part of the Hits Radio network. It broadcasts to Cumbria and South West Scotland. 

As of December 2022, the station has a weekly audience of 72,000 listeners according to RAJAR.

On 29 November 2022, Bauer announced that CFM will rebrand to Greatest Hits Radio on 3 April 2023. Robbie Dee will present the only non-networked programme, which will air each weekday between 1pm and 4pm.

History

The station was launched by its original owners, Border Television at 8am on 14 April 1993 when managing director and breakfast show host John Myers played "The Best" by Tina Turner as its first song.

In September 1995, they also started transmitting to West Cumbria from their transmitters at Broughton Moor and Whitehaven.

From its launch, the station broadcast from premises adjacent to the ITV Border studios in Durranhill, Carlisle. In April 2010, CFM moved to a new base at Atlantic House in Kingstown, Carlisle.

In 2005, Emap bought CFM and branded it as one of its Big City Network of stations. Three years later, Emap was bought by Bauer.

Previously, CFM has won numerous industry awards including the Radio Academy's North West Station of the Year 2005 and Emap Station of the Year 2006. In May 2013, CFM became the first radio station to broadcast from a nuclear reprocessing site at Sellafield, West Cumbria.

CFM was one of two stations within the Hits Radio Network that did not broadcast on DAB (the other being Radio Borders based in Galashiels). This was due to the lack of local DAB multiplexes in Cumbria. However, in May 2019, Ofcom announced plans to advertise three local multiplexes in Cumbria & South West Scotland. Bauer made the sole application to Ofcom to run the North & West Cumbria DAB Multiplex, stating that they planned to place CFM as well as other Bauer owned stations on it, alongside BBC Radio Cumbria. In December 2019, Ofcom confirmed that the multiplex licence would be awarded to Bauer Digital Radio, with the multiplex originally expected to begin transmission in late 2020. However, due to the ongoing COVID-19 pandemic, this had been pushed back to 1 December 2021.

On 1 December 2021, the DAB Multiplex for North and West Cumbria was switched on (the subsequent multiplex for South Cumbria and North Lancashire owned by MuxCo was also switched on but does not carry the same stations as the Bauer owned one), and CFM along with a number of other Bauer owned radio stations as well as BBC Radio Cumbria began broadcasting for the first time on DAB in the area.

Network programming approval  

In March 2021, it was announced that Bauer had received approval for full networking in North West England. It was hinted that CFM may move from its Carlisle studios to Bauer's Radio City Liverpool studios in the Radio City Tower, or the network's Manchester headquarters. It was also expressed that Bauer may reduce CFM's local programming to the minimum legal requirement of 3 hours per day.

On 21 April 2022, Bauer announced that local programming outside weekday breakfast would be replaced with further networked output from Hits Radio. Local news bulletins and traffic updates were not affected.

Programming

Networked programming originates from Bauer's Manchester headquarters.

Local programming is produced and broadcast from Bauer's Carlisle studios on weekdays from 6-10am.

News
Bauer's Carlisle newsroom broadcasts local news bulletins hourly from 6am-7pm on weekdays and from 7am-1pm on weekends. Headlines are broadcast on the half-hour during weekday breakfast and drivetime shows, alongside traffic bulletins.

National bulletins from Sky News Radio are carried overnight with bespoke networked bulletins on weekend afternoons, usually originating from Bauer's Leeds newsroom.

Notable past presenters

 Rich Clarke (Heart South)
 Lucy Horobin (Heart Dance)
 Dave Kelly (Radio City)
 John Myers (deceased) 

 Jason King (Heart London)
 Joel Ross (Rock FM)
 Tim Shaw

References

External links
 
 
 
 

Bauer Radio
Hits Radio
Radio stations in Cumbria
Radio stations established in 1993
1993 establishments in England